Qari Hekmatullah was an Uzbek Islamic militant and commander for the Islamic State of Iraq and the Levant in Afghanistan. With his main base of operations in Darzab District and Qush Tepa District of Jowzjan Province, he extended IS influence into Faryab Province and Sar-e Pol Province.

History

He was born in Uzbekistan and is sometimes said to be the son of Tohir Yoʻldosh, founder of the Islamic Movement of Uzbekistan.

He had long been a Taliban commander in Jowzjan Province and was their shadow governor for Darzab District.

In Nov 2015, he allegedly accused a woman of adultery and intended to stone her to death, but was prevented. This incident led to him being expelled by the Taliban for "cruel activities".

In October 2016 he joined the Islamic State of Iraq and the Levant and commanded at least 200 armed men. He soon moved into Qush Tepa District, defeating local Taliban.

In 2017 the governor of Sar-e-Pul province said Hekmat was increasing recruitment there.

Death
He was killed in a United States airstrike in the Khawaja Arab village of Bal Chiragh district of Faryab province on 5 April 2018.

References

2018 deaths
Islamic State of Iraq and the Levant members
Taliban leaders
Uzbekistani expatriates in  Afghanistan
Uzbekistani Islamists
Leaders of Islamic terror groups